Károly Szentiványi de Liptószentiván (January 1802 – 26 January 1877) was a Hungarian official and politician, who served as Speaker of the House of Representatives between 1865 and 1869.

References
 Jónás, Károly - Villám, Judit: A Magyar Országgyűlés elnökei 1848-2002. Argumentum, Budapest, 2002. pp. 91–93

1802 births
1877 deaths
19th-century Hungarian politicians
Speakers of the House of Representatives of Hungary
Politicians from Banská Bystrica